Central Conservation Area, is an administrative area which is managed by SINAC for the purposes of conservation in the central part of Costa Rica, notably the volcanic areas of the Cordillera Central. It contains six National Parks, several wildlife refuges and other types of nature reserves.

Protected areas
 Alberto Manuel Brenes Biological Reserve
 Atenas Hill Protected Zone
 Bosque Alegre Wildlife Refuge
 Braulio Carrillo National Park
 Caraigres Protected Zone
 Carpintera Hills Protected Zone
 Central Volcanic Mountain Range Forest Reserve
 Dantas Hill Private Wildlife Refuge
 El Chayote Protected Zone
 El Rodeo Protected Zone
 Escazú Hills Protected Zone
 Fernando Castro Cervantes Mixed Wildlife Refuge
 Grande River Protected Zone
 Grecia Forest Reserve
 Guayabo National Monument
 Irazú Volcano National Park
 La Selva Wildlife Refuge
 La Tirimbina Wildlife Refuge
 Los Quetzales National Park
 Los Santos Forest Reserve (shared with Pacific La Amistad Conservation Area)
 Macho River Forest Reserve
 Nara Hill Protected Zone
 Poás Volcano National Park
 Quitirrisí Protected Zone
 Rosario Creek Protected Zone
 Sombrero River–Navarro River Protected Zone
 Tapantí-Cerro de la Muerte Massif National Park
 Tapiria Wildlife Refuge
 Tiribí River Protected Zone
 Toro River Protected Zone
 Tuís River Basin Protected Zone
 Turrialba Volcano National Park
 Turrubares Hills Protected Zone
 Vueltas Hill Biological Reserve

See also 
 Jaguarundi Wildlife Refuge, a private refuge in the area.

References

External links 
 

Biosphere reserves of Costa Rica
Conservation Areas of Costa Rica